Abigail Whelan (born January 13, 1988) is an American politician from Minnesota and former member of the Minnesota House of Representatives. A member of the Republican Party of Minnesota, she represented District 35A, which included a portion of Anoka County, Minnesota.

Education and career
Whelan graduated from Anoka High School in 2006. She attended the University of Minnesota where she majored in political science and history and minored in economics. During her time there, she studied abroad in England and traveled extensively through Europe.  She earned her degree in 2010. After working for a time at the Minnesota Legislature, Whelan returned to the University of Minnesota Humphrey School of Public Affairs on a scholarship and earned her master's degree in public policy in 2013. From September 2012 until May 2013, Whelan worked as a Research/Teaching Assistant.  Before the 2014 election, Whelan worked locally with a home health care agency in business development.

Minnesota House of Representatives

Elections
Whelan was elected on November 4, 2014 defeating the (DFL) nominee, Peter Perovich, by 20.09% or 2616 votes.

Tenure
Whelan was sworn in on January 6, 2015. During her time as a state representative, she expressed disapproval of fetal tissue research at the University of Minnesota.

Committee assignments
For the 89th Legislative Session, Backer is a part of:
Education Innovation Policy Committee 
Higher Education Policy & Finance Committee 
Taxes Subcommittee: Property Tax & Local Government Finance Division
Transportation Policy & Finance Committee.

References

External links

1988 births
Living people
People from Anoka, Minnesota
University of Minnesota College of Liberal Arts alumni
Republican Party members of the Minnesota House of Representatives
Women state legislators in Minnesota
21st-century American politicians
21st-century American women politicians
Anoka High School alumni